is the Ambassador Extraordinary and Plenipotentiary of Japan to the Republic of France, and is a former ambassador of Japan to Russian Federation and Saudi Arabia.

See also 
 Ambassador of Japan to Russia

References 

1948 births
Living people
Ambassadors of Japan to France
Ambassadors of Japan to Russia
Ambassadors of Japan to Saudi Arabia